The Men's 10 km competition at the 2017 World Championships was held on 18 July 2017.

Results
The final was started at 10:00.

References

Men's 10 km